Acropolitis ptychosema is a species of moth of the family Tortricidae. It is found in Australia, where it has been recorded from Tasmania.

References

Archipini
Moths described in 1927
Moths of Australia
Taxa named by Alfred Jefferis Turner